Grammolingiidae is an extinct family of lacewing insect which existed in what is now China during the Middle Jurassic period.

Leptolingia imminuta, a species described in 2011, is the smallest known species in the family Grammolingiidae.

See also 
 2011 in paleontology
 2012 in arthropod paleontology

References

External links 

Prehistoric insect families
Neuroptera
Fossils of China